Portraits (So Long Ago, So Clear) is a 1996 compilation album of works by Greek electronic composer and artist Vangelis.

The album features some of the most-renowned Vangelis' solo work, as well as songs from Jon & Vangelis, his collaboration with Yes vocalist Jon Anderson.

Track listing 
All songs were written by Vangelis, except where noted.

Charts

Weekly charts

Year-end charts

Certifications

References

1996 compilation albums
Vangelis compilation albums